Mount Kuchela Dhura is a mountain located in Pithoragarh, Uttarakhand, India. It is located at the near true right bank of Lwa Glacier or true left bank of Shalang glacier, surrounded by Mount Nandakot, 6861 metres and 0.6041 metres to its south-west and north-east respectively. This peak offers a 3 km (approx.) long rutted ridge leading to Nanda Kot’s north face.

An unknown attempt was made in the late 1980s, and no information of route and team. IMF sent an 8 members team to the peak via west ridge during pre-monsoon season in the year 2012. Team left behind from the summit by almost around 500 horizontal & 88 vertical metres.

The Indian Mountaineering Foundation (IMF) sent an expedition in the month of August–September 2013 to Mt Kuchela Dhura. The core Indian team had total 10 members from different states of the country Dhruv Joshi from Almora(leader), Wallambok Lyngdoh from Shillong (Dy. Leader), Dr Anand Vaidya from Gujarat (Medical Officer), Ram Prasad Lodha (Rajasthan), Zoram sanga(Mizoram), Vineet Saini(U.P), Vijay Rautela(Uttarakhand), Banshngainlang Nongkynrih(Meghalaya), Karan Kumar Shandilya (Assam) and Chitramohan Singh (Uttarakhand). Four members Dhruv joshi, Wallambok Lyngdoh, Chitramohan & Vijay Rautela successfully scaled the mountain on 6 September 2013 at 0820 hrs and made the first international and national ascent of the peak.

The expedition was flagged off by Col(Rtd) J P Bhagatjee on 15 August 2013, Director IMF and flagged in by Mick Fowler (Legendary Mountaineer and President of Alpine Club) on 20 September 2013. This expedition was sponsored by the Indian Mountaineering Foundation, Ministry of Youth Affairs & sports.

Main peaks around Kuchela Dhura:
 Changuch, 
 Nanda Kot, 
 Nanda Devi East, 

Mountains of Uttarakhand
Geography of Pithoragarh district